Karl Hein may refer to:
 Karl Hein (athlete)
 Karl Hein (footballer)